Kernow (formerly known as First Kernow) is a bus company operating services in Cornwall, England. It is part of First South West, a subsidiary of FirstGroup.

History

Kernow is a division of First South West, which was formed from two previous operators: Western National (in Cornwall and South Devon) and Red Bus (in North Devon).

First purchased Truronian coaches in 2008, which now forms part of Kernow.

It was announced on 6 January 2020 that Cornwall Council had awarded the entire tendered bus network in the county, except the Truro park & ride service, to the Go-Ahead Group from 1 April. It is operated under their Go Cornwall Bus brand. The contract consists of 73 routes, which made up roughly half of the First Kernow network at the start of 2020. First retain their commercially operated routes and the Truro park & ride contract.

Routes
Kernow routes mainly cover central and west Cornwall, west of an imaginary line connecting Camelford, Bodmin and Fowey, although two services continue along the north coast from Camelford as far as Bude.

Kernow operates the Park for Truro service in Truro on behalf of Cornwall Council, as well as services intended primarily for university students between Truro, Redruth and Falmouth University campuses in Falmouth and Penryn (using route numbers prefixed U).

During the summer months, Kernow operates open top buses. In 2017, the service was relaunched under the Atlantic Coaster brand with Plaxton President bodied Dennis Trident 2s drafted in to replace the Alexander bodied Volvo Citybuses. In 2022 First Kernow operated four 'Coaster' branded open top bus routes in Cornwall: the Land's End Coaster (Penzance - Marazion - St Ives - Land’s End - Penzance Circular); the Tin Coaster (Penzance - Lower Boscawell); the Atlantic Coaster (Newquay - Padstow); and the Falmouth Coaster (Falmouth Circular).

Most Kernow routes are interurban or rural in character, but there are local town services in some of the larger urban areas – Falmouth, Newquay, Penzance and St Austell, as well as the Park & Ride service in Truro.

Kernow took over some of Western Greyhound's routes following that company's sudden closure in March 2015, which meant that First returned in force to Newquay and neighbouring settlements (including Padstow, Perranporth and Wadebridge), where nearly all services had been operated by Western Greyhound for some years. Western Greyhound had also possessed some services in the Penzance and St Austell areas, most of which were also transferred to Kernow.

Many rural routes where lost when the Transport for Cornwall contract was given to Plymouth Citybus by Cornwall Council in March 2020.  The only bus routes still operated by First Kernow are the U/T/L prefixed routes, "Coaster" branded services, "Sunseeker" S1/S2 routes, The "Mousehole" branded service between Penzance, Newlyn & Mousehole and the unbranded 17, 19, 24, 27, and 91. These are operated on a commercial basis. All of the Truro College routes and some school buses are run as well. In May 2021, Kernow started the Cornwall Daytripper brand based around the Eden Project, added a Falmouth Coaster and Discover Exeter operated with open toppers and Dartmoor Explorer with B7TLs.

Depots
The principal maintenance depot is at Camborne with a second in the Newquay area at Summercourt, which was acquired from Western Greyhound after that company had ceased to trade. The depots at Penzance and Truro also carry out some vehicle checks and minor maintenance.

Main depots
Camborne
Summercourt (Newquay). Former base for Western Greyhound bus company.

Other depots
Penzance
Truro

Outstations
Bodmin
Bude
Eden Project (near St Austell)
Falmouth
Helston
Padstow
Plymouth
Exeter
Winkleigh

Fleet
First Kernow had an older fleet of buses, virtually all of which had been cascaded from other FirstGroup fleets. They included Plaxton Presidents on Volvo B7TL and Dennis Trident 2 chassis, Plaxton Pointer on Dennis Dart chassis, Optare Solo's and Mercedes-Benz Citaros from Western Greyhound. Several closed top Volvo B7TL Plaxton Presidents were converted to part open top for 'Atlantic Coaster' routes for the 2017 summer season.

First Kernow received 30 new Alexander Dennis Enviro400 MMCs in late 2016/early 2017 for use on its U1/U2 (blue livery) routes and the Tinner T1/T2 routes (red livery). A further 21 Enviro400 MMCs and 20 Alexander Dennis Enviro200 MMCs and 14 Optare Solo SRs were purchased in December 2018.

Most services use green buses or those in First Group corporate pastel colours. Certain branded routes have dedicated liveries:

References

External links

Kernow website

FirstGroup bus operators in England
Bus operators in Cornwall